Hakkari–Yüksekova Selahaddin Eyyubi Airport  is a public airport in Yüksekova, a town in Hakkari Province, Turkey.

History
Groundbreaking at the airport took place on 17 July 2010. The airport became a sabotage target of the terrorist organization Kurdistan Workers' Party (PKK) long before the construction works began. Claiming that the airport will be used for military purposes, the PKK attacked three containers at the building site with firearms and threw a hand-made bomb from a passing-by car two weeks before the groundbreaking. Eleven trucks, a bulldozer and 17 telephone sets were set to fire. 25 workers were taken hostage. They were released after threatening. 70 workers quit their job and left the town due to threat notes distributed in the district. Eleven people, who transported material to the construction site, were kidnapped. Already two months before the completion of the airport, the PKK threatened the construction workers saying "We won't be responsible for anything, which can happen." The attacks caused a delay of 250 days.

The construction of the airport has started on 18 July 2010. It was opened to public/civil air traffic at 26 May 2015. During the inauguration ceremony attended by President Recep Tayyip Erdoğan and Prime minister Ahmet Davutoğlu, it was announced that the airport is renamed Hakkari–Yüksekova Selahaddin Eyyubi Airport after Saladin (1137/1138–1193), a Muslim leader of Kurdish origin, who fought against Crusaders and captured Jerusalem.

Technical details
The airport has a  runway, a  airport apron, a  taxiway and a  terminal building. A -long road surrounds the facility. The ai The airport was projected with a passenger traffic volume of 1 million annually. The construction cost  120 million.

Airlines and destinations

Traffic Statistics

References

External links
 Devlet Hava Meydanları İşletmesi Genel Müdürlüğü

Airports in Turkey
Buildings and structures in Hakkari Province
Airports established in 2015
2015 establishments in Turkey
Transport in Hakkari Province